Aliquli Jabbadar (‘Alī-qolī Jabbadār) was an Iranian artist, one of the first to have incorporated European influences in the traditional Safavid-era miniature painting. He is known for his scenes of the Safavid courtly life, especially his careful rendition of the physical setting and of details of dress.

Jabbadar's name appears on a number of miniatures dating from the 17th century, including four from the State Hermitage in Russia and four from the Metropolitan Museum of Arts in the United States. In one of the signatures, the artist refers himself to as farangi, "the Frank", a reference to his European, or more probably, to Georgian and Christian origin. Furthermore, two of his paintings bear Georgian inscriptions. He also referred himself as ghulāmzāda-i qadimi ("former slave"), beg ("lord"), naqqash-bashi ("head of mosaics") and jabbadār ("keeper of the armory"), suggesting that he was one of those ghulām, who rose to ranks at the Safavid court.

References

Further reading

External links

Persian miniature painters
Iranian people of Georgian descent
17th-century Iranian painters
Artists from Georgia (country)
17th-century painters of Safavid Iran